"I Can't Turn Around" is a song written and originally performed by soul singer Isaac Hayes as the lead single from his 1975 album Chocolate Chip.

House music cover versions
In 1986, a house music cover of the song by J.M. Silk reached number one on the U.S. Billboard Hot Dance Music/Club Play chart with lead vocals performed by Keith Nunnally. The single was the only US dance number one for J.M. Silk. It did also enter the UK singles chart in October 1986, peaking at number sixty-two, but was strongly outsold there by Farley "Jackmaster" Funk's reworked version of the song, entitled "Love Can't Turn Around". Farley's version copied elements of Hurley's arrangement with new lyrics by Vince Lawrence and vocals performed by Darryl Pandy, peaking at number ten in UK Top 75 and number fifteen on the US Dance chart.

Official versions
"I Can't Turn Around (LP Version)" - 3:57
"I Can't Turn Around (House Mix)" - 7:35
"I Can't Turn Around (Radio Mix)" - 3:23
"I Can't Turn Around (House of Trix Mix)" - 8:59
"I Can't Turn Around (Insane Mix)" - 4:08

Charts and sales

See also
List of number-one dance hits (United States)
List of artists who reached number one on the US Dance chart

References

External links
 [ Steve "Silk" Hurley] on AllMusic
 [ J.M. Silk] on AllMusic

1975 singles
1986 singles
Steve "Silk" Hurley songs
Songs written by Isaac Hayes
1975 songs
RCA Records singles